Cryptolechia coriata is a moth in the family Depressariidae. It was described by Edward Meyrick in 1914. It is found in Taiwan.

References

Moths described in 1914
Cryptolechia (moth)
Taxa named by Edward Meyrick